Turicum was a Swiss automobile manufactured between 1904 and 1906 in Zurich, 1907 till 1912 in Uster. Turicum is the Latin name of Zurich. The first car made by Martin Fischer was a small single-seater go-kart like vehicle, 140 cm long, with pedal-operated steering and powered by a motorcycle engine. It had chain drive but a second prototype had friction drive. The friction drive consisted of a flat steel disc coupled to the engine which drove a small, leather-covered wheel running at right angles to its surface. The small wheel could be moved across the surface of the large disc, giving an infinitely variable gear ratio. They attracted little public interest. The Swiss industrialist Jakob Heusser was also involved to establish the car manufacturer.

Production cars
More conventional production cars, manufactured in Uster, with steering wheel and two-seater body were shown at the Paris Salon in 1906 and had a single-cylinder air-cooled engine of 785 cc capacity.  A false radiator was fitted that acted as a fuel tank. The friction drive was retained and would be used on all the future cars.

In 1907 the 10/12 hp model with four-cylinder engine of 1385 cc was introduced, and the single-cylinder model had its engine enlarged to 1045 cc.  Two- and four-seat, open and closed bodies were offered. Martin Fisher left the company in September 1907. In 1912 a 16/26 model with 2613 cc engine was announced and this could be ordered with a conventional gearbox.

Exports
Sales in the home country were good, and cars were exported to Egypt, Italy, France, Germany, England, Denmark, Russia, Poland, Hungary, Turkey, Argentina and South Africa, but the company hit financial problems and stopped production end of 1912, but kept registered until 1925.

Preservation
Some eleven cars still survive.

References

External links
 conceptcarz has picture of the 1907 Turicum 12 HP Model F at the Swiss Transport Museum in Lucerne, Switzerland

Car manufacturers of Switzerland
Defunct motor vehicle manufacturers of Switzerland
Defunct companies of Switzerland
Uster